FC Grand Olympique de Menabe is a Malagasy football club who currently plays in  the THB Champions League the top division of Malagasy football.
The team is based in the Menabe region  in western Madagascar.

References

External links
Soccerway

Grand Olympique